Erwin is an unincorporated community in Washington County, Mississippi, United States.

It is located on the north shore of Lake Washington.

The Erwin House is located there, and dates back to 1830.  It is the oldest extant structure in Washington County, and is listed on the National Register of Historic Places.

As part of a widespread Anti-Italianism, vigilante mobs attacked Italians in Mississippi, and in 1901, murders took place in Erwin.

References

Unincorporated communities in Washington County, Mississippi
Unincorporated communities in Mississippi